Scott William Smith (born 7 February 2001) is a professional footballer who plays as a midfielder for the  club Torquay United on loan from Wigan Athletic. Born in England, he is a youth international for Wales.

Career
Smith joined the youth academy of Wigan Athletic, and worked his way up their youth categories. He signed his first professional contract in 2019, and he captained their U23 side in the 2020-21 season. He made his professional debut with Wigan in a 1–1 (7–8) EFL Cup penalty shootout win over Hull City on 10 August 2021.

International career
Born in England, Smith is of Welsh descent. He is a youth international for Wales, having represented the Wales U19s.

Career statistics

References

External links
 

2001 births
Living people
Footballers from Wigan
Welsh footballers
Wales youth international footballers
English footballers
English people of Welsh descent
Wigan Athletic F.C. players
National League (English football) players
Association football midfielders